The 1894 South Carolina gubernatorial election was held on November 6, 1894 to select the governor of the state of South Carolina. John Gary Evans was nominated by the Democrats and became the 85th governor of South Carolina.

Democratic campaign
The conservatives had been so thoroughly defeated by Ben Tillman in 1890 and 1892 that they did not offer a candidate for the gubernatorial election. Instead, it became a contest between four Tillmanites: William Ellerbe, John Gary Evans, Dr. Sampson Pope and J.E. Tindal. All four claimed to be the candidate favored by Tillman, but an embarrassed Tillman responded, "They ought to be spanked for quarrelling about who is the closest friend of Tillman." Initially, Tillman privately supported Ellerbe because he was a farmer, but Tillman became more attracted to Evans as he proved to be a better orator during the campaign. Evans also was able to woo Senator Irby to his side, who placed the Tillman machine squarely behind his candidacy.

Ellerbe, Pope and Tindall sensed that they would be unable to win any of the delegates for their candidacy at the Democratic convention and therefore requested a primary election to select the statewide ticket. Tillman refused this request and Evans was unanimously selected as the Democratic gubernatorial candidate at the Democratic convention in Columbia on September 1.

General election
Sampson Pope denounced the selection of Evans as the Democratic candidate by declaring it ring rule because the state Democratic party was completely run by Tillman and his cronies. He entered the general election as an independent candidate, but the Tillmanites used the quote uttered by Wade Hampton that "an independent was worse than a Radical" to great effect and Pope's campaign was nothing more than a protest vote.

The general election was held on November 6, 1894 and John Gary Evans was easily elected as governor of South Carolina against Sampson Pope.  Turnout increased for this election over the previous election because it was a contested election, but only by just over 100 votes.

 
 

|-
| 
| colspan=5 |Democratic hold
|-

See also
Governor of South Carolina
List of governors of South Carolina
South Carolina gubernatorial elections

Notes

References

"Election Returns." Reports and Resolutions of the General Assembly of the State of South Carolina at the Regular Session Commencing Nov. 27th, 1894. Volume I. Columbia, SC: Charles A. Calvo, Jr., 1894, p. 470.

External links
SCIway Biography of Governor John Gary Evans

1894
Gubernatorial
South Carolina
November 1894 events